Gwynfor Llewellyn (born 19 August 1958) is a Welsh editor. He is known for editing many programmes for the BBC. In 2000 he won a Welsh BAFTA.

References

External links

Welsh editors
Living people
1958 births
Place of birth missing (living people)